Bolbaffroides carenicollis, is a species of dor beetle found in India, Pakistan and Sri Lanka.

Description
This large species has an average length of about 19 to 23 mm. Pronotum with triple punctation with sparse primary punctation. Secondary and tertiary punctation also abundant which evenly distributed on disc. Pronotal protrusions are variable in accordance with total size. Crest of the frontal elevation of female is slightly more rostrad. Elytra opaque.

References 

Bolboceratidae
Insects of Sri Lanka
Insects described in 1840